Kai Schramayer (born 10 January 1968) is a retired German wheelchair tennis player who competed at international level events. He was a former World no. 1 in the sport and is a double Paralympic medalist.

Schramayer was a very sporty person: he played ice hockey, volleyball, basketball and soccer at a young age and pursued his interest in tennis aged six years old. He lost his left femur to bone cancer when he was fourteen years old after his mother noticed that her son complained about pain in his leg when going up stairs. After his leg got amputated, he went back to playing tennis with a prosthesis. He soon discovered wheelchair tennis and played competitively in the later 1980s and won many wheelchair doubles titles in 1990 with his partner Randy Snow.

References

External links
 
 

1968 births
Living people
German male tennis players
Wheelchair tennis players
Paralympic wheelchair tennis players of Germany
Wheelchair tennis players at the 1992 Summer Paralympics
Wheelchair tennis players at the 2000 Summer Paralympics
Medalists at the 1992 Summer Paralympics
Medalists at the 2000 Summer Paralympics
Sportspeople from Heidelberg
Sportspeople from Vancouver
German emigrants to Canada
Tennis people from Baden-Württemberg
ITF World Champions